This is a list of accidents and incidents involving Dutch airline KLM. The airline suffered 63 incidents and has had no fatal accidents since 1977.

1920s–1930s 
24 April 1924
Fokker F.III H-NABS disappeared while on a Lympne–Rotterdam flight with three on board. The aircraft was presumed to have crashed into the sea.

25 June 1925
Fokker F.III H-NABM struck trees and crashed at Locquignol, France while flying too low in poor visibility, killing all four on board. 

9 July 1926
Fokker F.VII H-NACC crashed in thick fog near Wolverthem, Belgium, killing both pilots.

22 August 1927Fokker F.VIII H-NADU crashed near Sevenoaks, England, following failure of the tailfin and rudder. One crewmember was killed.

24 July 1928
Fokker F.III H-NABR stalled and crashed at Waalhaven after striking several ship masts after takeoff; one passenger drowned when the fuselage sank. The pilot had experience in the Fokker F.VII and not the F.III and began the takeoff too early.

6 December 1931
Fokker F.VII PH-AFO crashed at Bangkok while attempting to take off, killing three of seven on board. A ventilation hatch above the cockpit opened which spoiled lift and prevented the aircraft from taking off. The plane departed the end of the runway, struck a berm, and came to rest upside down in a rice field. 

20 December 1934
Douglas DC-2-115A PH-AJU Uiver crashed at Rutbah Wells, Iraq, killing all occupants. The aircraft had participated in the Mac Robertson Air Race in October 1934, and won the handicap division. It was on its first flight after return from the race and was en route to the Netherlands East Indies carrying Christmas mail when it crashed.

6 April 1935
Fokker F.XII PH-AFL Leeuwerik struck a mountain  from Brilon, Germany after it encountered severe snow and thunderstorms, killing all seven on board.

14 July 1935
Fokker F.XXII PH-AJQ Kwikstaart crashed and burned just outside Schiphol after both left side engines failed due to a defect in the fuel system, killing four crew and two passengers. Fourteen occupants survived.

20 July 1935
Douglas DC-2-115E PH-AKG Gaai crashed near the San Bernardino Pass near Pian San Giacomo due to wing and fuselage icing, killing all three crew and all 10 passengers.

18 December 1935
Koolhoven FK.43 PH-AJJ collided in mid-air with a Fokker C.I over Schiphol Airport for reasons unknown; the FK.43 lost control and crashed, killing the pilot.

9 December 1936
Douglas DC-2-115E PH-AKL Lijster lost control and crashed into a house after taking off from Croydon Airport, killing 15 of the 17 people on board, including Juan de la Cierva, inventor of the autogyro.

3 April 1937
Douglas DC-3-194B PH-ALP Pluvier was being delivered to KLM when it struck Mount Baldy, Arizona in poor weather, killing all eight on board.

28 July 1937
Douglas DC-2-115L PH-ALF Flamingo crashed in a field near Beert, Belgium following an unexplained in-flight fire, killing all 15 on board.

6 October 1937
Douglas DC-3-194B PH-ALS Specht crashed on take-off from Talang Betoetoe Airport following engine failure, killing four of 11 on board.

14 November 1938
Douglas DC-3-194D PH-ARY IJsvogel struck the ground and crashed near Schiphol Airport for unknown reasons, probably due to crew errors, killing six of 19 on board.

9 December 1938
Lockheed 14-WF62 Super Electra PH-APE Ekster crashed on take-off from Schiphol Airport because of engine failure while on a training flight, killing the four crew.

10 June 1939
Koolhoven F.K.43 PH-AJK Krekel stalled and crashed at Vlissingen, killing all three on board.

1940s 
28 December 1941
KNILM Douglas DC-3 PK-ALN Nandoe (formerly KLM PH-ALN) was destroyed on the ground by Japanese fighters at Medan, North Sumatera, Dutch East Indies, killing all crew members and passengers.

22 August 1942
Lockheed 14-WF62 Super Electra PJ-AIP Parkiet lost control just after takeoff and crashed near Piarco Airport for reasons unknown, killing all 13 on board; weather was probably to blame for the accident.

14 November 1946
Douglas C-47A PH-TBW crashed at Schiphol Airport during a failed landing in poor weather, killing all 26 on board, including Dutch writer Herman de Man.

26 January 1947
Douglas DC-3C PH-TCR crashed after take-off from Copenhagen, killing all 22 on board, including Prince Gustaf Adolf of Sweden.

20 October 1948
Lockheed L-049 Constellation PH-TEN Nijmegen crashed near Prestwick, Scotland due to crew errors, killing all 40 aboard.

23 June 1949
Lockheed L-749-79-33 Constellation PH-TER Roermond, piloted by Hans Plesman—the son of CEO Albert Plesman—crashed into the sea off Bari after it entered a high speed dive for unknown reasons, probably due to an autopilot failure, killing 33 occupants.

12 July 1949
Lockheed L-749-79-33 Constellation PH-TDF Franeker crashed into a  hill in Jagruti Nagar, Ghatkopar, near Bombay (now Mumbai), India due to pilot error (although sabotage was not ruled out), killing all 45 aboard, including 13 American news correspondents.

1950s–1970s 
2 February 1950
The aircraft was operating an Amsterdam-London passenger service.

22 March 1952
Flight 592, operated by Douglas DC-6 Koningin Juliana, crashed at Frankfurt while flying too low for reasons unknown, killing 45 of the 47 occupants.

23 August 1954
Flight 608, operated by Douglas DC-6B Willem Bontekoe, crashed between Shannon, Ireland, and Schiphol in the North Sea,  from IJmuiden for reasons unknown, killing all 21 on board.

5 September 1954
Flight 633, operated by Lockheed L-1049C-55-81 Super Constellation Triton, ditched in the River Shannon after takeoff from Shannon Airport. Twenty eight of the 56 people on board (46 passengers and 10 crew) were killed.

16 July 1957
Flight 844, operated by Lockheed L-1049C-55-81 Super Constellation Neutron, crashed in the sea near Biak, after takeoff from Mokmer Airport at Biak on its way to Manila. The pilot made a low farewell pass over the island, but the aircraft lost altitude, crashed into the sea and exploded, killing 48 of 58 on board.

14 August 1958

19 February 1958
Flight 543, operated by Douglas DC-6B PH-DFK Jan Huygen van Linschoten, ran off the runway while landing at Almaza Airport, Egypt. The co-pilot died after he was struck by the still-rotating number one propeller when he escaped the aircraft through an emergency window. The aircraft was repaired and returned to service. 

12 June 1961
Flight 823, operated by Lockheed L-188C Electra Sirius, crashed on approach to Cairo International Airport due to pilot error, killing 20 of 36 on board.

25 October 1968
KLM Aerocarto Douglas C-47A PH-DAA flew into Tafelberg Mountain, Suriname, following an engine failure while on a survey flight. The aircraft collided with the mountain in cloudy conditions, killing three of the five people on board.

27 March 1977, 
Flight 4805 collided on the runway with Pan Am 1736 in heavy fog at Tenerife Airport, resulting in 583 fatalities. Both aircraft were 747s. Although the Pan American 747 had 61 survivors, all aboard the KLM aircraft perished.

Notable incidents without fatalities
2 September 1921
de Havilland DH.9 H-NABP crashed at Waalhaven while attempting an emergency landing following engine failure; the pilot survived. This was the first accident involving a KLM aircraft.

26 October 1921
Fokker F.III H-NABL crashed while on approach to Rotterdam from London. The aircraft landed in low visibility, struck the ground and crashed upside down. The pilot, the sole occupant, survived and although the aircraft was written off, it was rebuilt and re-registered H-NABR and returned to service, but was destroyed in a 1928 crash.

17 May 1922
Fokker F.III H-NABT struck a tree and crashed at Hythe, Kent in poor visibility while on approach to Croydon; all four on board survived.

17 July 1923
Fokker F.III H-NABM stalled and crashed while on approach to Croydon Airport after the engine lost power; all four on board survived. The aircraft was written off and salvaged for parts.

4 November 1925
Fokker F.III H-NABI crashed in an open field at Hamburg shortly after takeoff in poor weather; all three on board survived.

21 June 1926
Fokker F.VII H-NACL ditched in the English Channel off Hythe, Kent following engine failure, probably due to fuel system problems; all five on board survived.

11 April 1928
Fokker F.VIII H-NAEE crashed while on approach to Amsterdam following engine failure; all 11 on board survived.

19 October 1929
Fokker F.VIIb/3m PH-AGB struck trees and crashed in hilly terrain near Konia, Istanbul while attempting to return to Istanbul following left engine failure; all three crew survived.

4 August 1931
Fokker F.IX PH-AFK suffered a loss of power on the left engine shortly after takeoff from Waalhaven Airport. The pilot decided to continue but while flying over a shipyard the engine failed completely and the aircraft lost altitude. Control was lost and the aircraft crashed on a rail line just outside the airport. All 15 on board survived. 

26 May 1933
Koolhoven FK.43 PH-AIL Luis stalled and crashed at Groningen during a training flight following a loss of control while in a left turn; both pilots survived.

17 July 1935
Douglas DC-2 PH-AKM Maraboe crashed and burned on takeoff from Bushehr, Iran after the right main gear broke off due to an uneven runway. All occupants were rescued.

15 July 1936
Fokker F.VIIb/3m PH-AEZ Zwaluw lost control and crashed upside down while taxiing at Haamstede after encountering strong winds in a storm; all three crew survived. The aircraft was being moved to a safe place due to threatening weather at the airport when the accident occurred.

17 December 1937
Koolhoven FK.43 PH-AKC stalled and crashed at Groningen during a training flight; both pilots survived.

6 June 1939
Douglas DC-2 PH-AKN Nachtegaal crashed at Schiphol Airport during a single-engine training flight, killing one person on the ground; all four crew survived. The aircraft was rebuilt and returned to service until it was destroyed in a German air raid on 10 May 1940.

10 May 1940
During the German invasion of the Netherlands, nine KLM aircraft  were destroyed in a German air raid at Schiphol Airport by aircraft from KG 4.

6 November 1946
Douglas C-47A PH-TBO crashed near Shere on approach to Croydon Airport after a flight from Amsterdam. All 20 passengers and crew survived the accident. The altimeter had been set incorrectly.

27 December 1947
Douglas C-47A PH-TCV crashed near Leeuwarden after the left wing struck a church steeple; the aircraft belly-landed and skidded across some ditches which broke off both propellers. All 15 on board survived.

8 March 1948
Boeing Canada PB2B-1 Canso PK-CTC crashed shortly after takeoff from Poso, Indonesia; all 13 on board survived.

1 May 1948
Douglas DC-6 PH-TKW Koningin Wilhelmina crashed at Schiphol Airport during a training flight due to propeller control problems or pilot error; all three crew survived.

June 16, 1948
Douglas DC-4-1009 PH-TCF Friesland struck trees and landed short while landing at Schiphol Airport due to pilot error; all 27 on board survived.

23 March 1952
Lockheed L-749A Constellation PH-TFF Venlo suffered a No. 3 propeller fatigue failure and subsequent engine fire during landing in Bangkok. All 44 passengers and crew escaped shortly before the fire completely consumed the aircraft. A Thai ground crewman ran into the burning aircraft and returned with an infant who had been left behind.

1 January 1953
Douglas C-54B PH-TDL Groningen force-landed in the desert 17 miles from Dhahran Airport due to fuel exhaustion after the crew diverted twice due to poor visibility. All 66 passengers and crew on board survived. The pilot was later reprimanded by KLM and temporarily demoted to co-pilot.

25 May 1953
Convair CV-240-4 PH-TEI Paulus Potter lost altitude just after takeoff from Schiphol Airport. The aircraft belly-landed on the runway and slid off, crossed a road and came to rest in a field. All 34 passengers and crew survived, however, two people who were watching the aircraft died when the aircraft crossed the road. The crew had retracted the flaps too soon during takeoff.

11 June 1961
While flying over the Atlantic Ocean at 17000 feet en route to Prestwick, a vibration developed in the number one engine and propeller of Douglas DC-7C PH-DSN Noordsee. Airspeed was lost and the aircraft began descending. Fifteen minutes after the vibration began, while the crew was preparing to ditch the aircraft, the engine suddenly broke loose and fell off. The aircraft continued to Prestwick where it landed safely; all 81 on board survived. The vibration was caused by a failure in the number one forward propeller shaft bearing.

3 June 1983
McDonnell Douglas DC-10-30 PH-DTE Wolfgang Amadeus Mozart left the runway while landing at Tocumen International Airport, causing the nosegear to collapse; all 27 on board survived. The aircraft was repaired and returned to service.

15 December 1989
Flight 867, operated by Boeing 747-406 City of Calgary, suffered failure of all four engines after it flew through a volcanic ash cloud from Mount Redoubt en route to Tokyo from Amsterdam. While descending the crew were able to restart the engines and the aircraft performed an emergency landing at Anchorage with no casualties to the 245 on board.

28 January 1994
Flight 136, a Fokker 100 (PH-KLG), landed hard at Schiphol International Airport, collapsing the right main landing gear; all 76 on board survived. The aircraft was repaired and returned to service.

28 November 2004
Flight 1673, operated by Boeing 737-400 PH-BTC David Livingstone, suffered a birdstrike upon rotation from Amsterdam Airport Schiphol. The aircraft continued onward to Barcelona International Airport, where the nose gear collapsed. No injuries or casualties were reported. The aircraft was written off.

13 December 2013
Boeing 737-8K2 PH-BXZ was struck by US Airways Flight 798, a Boeing 757, while parked at Schiphol International Airport. A computer glitch showed gate D49 (where the 737 was parked) as not in use, but it actually was as the 737 had been delayed. The 757 was cleared to taxi to gate D51, not realizing that the 737 was still there. While taxiing into position at D51, the 757's right outer wing sheared off the left winglet on the 737; the 757 suffered damage to the wing leading edge. There were no casualties.

13 February 2019
Flight 601, a Boeing 747-406M (PH-BFV), struck Flight 623, a Boeing 787-9 Dreamliner (PH-BHA) during pushback at Schiphol International Airport. The 747's right winglet struck the right side horizontal stabilizer on the 787. Both aircraft were grounded for repairs with the 747 returning to service three days later. The incident remains under investigation.

9 July 2019
Flight 1699, a Boeing 737-8K2 (PH-BXH), struck EasyJet Europe Flight U28868, an Airbus A320, during pushback at Schiphol International Airport. The A320's left winglet struck the left side elevator on the 737. Both aircraft were grounded for inspection and repairs. The incident remains under investigation.

21 February 2020
Flight 808, a Boeing 777-306 (PH-BVU), had a female passenger started coughing after departure from Manila. Over Russia, she suddenly felt unwell and fell into her seat. Another passenger alerted the cabin crew who provided medical assistance, a Dutch doctor helped the cabin crew to perform CPR in the aircraft galley. The flight performed an emergency landing at Stockholm Arlanda Airport at 04:50am (CET). Upon arrival the woman was pronounced dead. The severity of the emergency landing required the aircraft to undergo additional inspection.

Hijackings
16 April 1962
Douglas DC-7C PH-DSH Caribische Zee was hijacked by one man demanding to be flown to East Berlin.

19 March 1971
A man armed with an Uzi submachine gun, stole a car at Zanderij International Airport and drove to a parked KLM Douglas DC-8 (PH-DCM, Henry Dunant) on the apron. He boarded the aircraft and threatened a flight attendant. An hour later two border police agents boarded the aircraft and convinced the hijacker to surrender.

25 November 1973
Flight 861, operated by Boeing 747-206B Mississippi, was hijacked over Iraq by Palestinian terrorists. The aircraft took off in Amsterdam and was bound for Tokyo. After several hours it made its final landing in Dubai. The passengers were released earlier in Malta. Everyone survived the hijacking.

4 September 1976
Flight 366, operated by McDonnell Douglas DC-9-33RC PH-DNM City of Madrid flying from Malaga to Amsterdam with an intermediate stop in Nice, was hijacked shortly after takeoff from Nice by Palestinian terrorists. After aborted attempts to land in Tunis, the aircraft landed in Larnaca, Cyprus. After refuelling, the hijackers attempted to reach Palestine before the aircraft was turned around by Israeli F-4 Phantoms. After returning to Cyprus, the passengers were released unharmed and the hijackers surrendered.

6 August 1978
Douglas DC-9-32 PH-DNS City of Arnhem was hijacked by one person who demanded to be flown to Algiers; the hijacker was taken down.

23 December 1987
Flight 343, a Boeing 737-206 (PH-PDE), was hijacked to Rome by a 15-year-old boy who claimed to have a bomb in his luggage. At Rome, the hijacker demanded 1 million dollars and to be flown to the US. He allowed 60 passengers to leave the aircraft while negotiations began. He was later overpowered by police when he was lured from the aircraft, ostensibly to be driven to another aircraft to be flown to New York. No weapon was found.

15 August 1993
Flight 110, a Boeing 737-406 (PH-BDS), was hijacked by a lone 40-year-old Egyptian man. He claimed to have a bomb and demanded to be flown to New York, apparently to force the release of Egyptian cleric Shaykh Omar Abdel Rahman, who was in custody on immigration violations. Several of Rahman's followers were charged in the 1993 World Trade Center bombing. The hijacker also demanded the UN to enforce sanctions against Serbia in the Balkan conflict. The aircraft landed at Dusseldorf, ostensibly to refuel. The hjiacker released everyone on board except two crew and negotiations began. He set a deadline for the release of the Shaykh, and threatened to blow up the aircraft if this demand wasn't met. Ten hours after landing, German GSG 9 commandos stormed the aircraft and arrested the hijacker without incident.

References

Notes 

KLM